The Thornhill, later Compton-Thornhill Baronetcy, of Riddlesworth Hall in the Parish of Riddlesworth in the County of Norfolk and of Pakenham Lodge in the Parish of Pakenham in the County of Suffolk, was a title in the Baronetage of the United Kingdom. It was created on 11 August 1885 for Thomas Thornhill, Conservative Member of Parliament for West Suffolk. The second Baronet assumed the additional surname of Compton on 9 May 1901. The title became extinct on his death in 1949.

Thornhill, later Compton-Thornhill baronets, of Riddlesworth Hall and of Pakenham Lodge (1885)
Sir Thomas Thornhill, 1st Baronet (1837–1900)
Sir Anthony John Compton-Thornhill, 2nd Baronet (1868–1949)

See also
Thornhill baronets

References

Extinct baronetcies in the Baronetage of the United Kingdom
People from Breckland District